Frip may refer to:

FRIP or Revolutionary and Popular Indoamericano Front (Frente Indoamericano Revolucionario y Popular), political movement in Argentina
Frip, fictional village in children's book The Very Persistent Gappers of Frip by George Saunders

See also
Fripp (disambiguation)